Willie James Howard (July 13, 1928 – January 2, 1944) was a 15-year-old African-American living in Live Oak, Suwannee County, Florida. He was lynched for having given Christmas cards to all his co-workers at the Van Priest Dime Store, including Cynthia Goff, a white girl, followed by a letter to her on New Year's Day.

New Year's Day letter
The New Year's Day letter read:
Dear Friend,
Just a few line[s] to let you hear from me [.] I am well an[d] hope you are the same. This is what I said on that [C]hristmas card. From W. J. H. With L. [love] I hope you will understand what I mean. That is what I said[.] [N]ow please don’t get angry with me because you can never tell what may get in some body[.] I did not put it in there my self. God did[.] I can't help what he does[,] can I[?] I know you don’t think much of our kind of people but we don’t hate you all[.] [W]e want to be your all friends but you want let us [.] [P]lease don't let any body see this[.] I hope I haven't made you [mad.] [I]f I did tell me about it an[d] I will [forget] about it. I wish this was [a] northern state[.] I guess you call me fresh. Write an[d] tell me what you think of me[,] good or bad. Sincerely yours, with, [sic]
     From Y.K.W.
Fo[r] Cynthia Goff
I love your name. I love your voice, for a S.H. [sweetheart] you are my choice.

Reaction to letter and death of Willie James Howard
Cynthia was offended by the card and letter, and gave them to her father A.P. "Phil" Goff, the Live Oak postmaster and a former state legislator.

Goff, along with S.B. McCullers and Reg H. Scott, allegedly went to Willie's house and took the youth from his mother at gunpoint. They picked up Willie's father, James Howard, at the Bond-Howell Lumber Company where he worked, then drove to the Suwannee River east of Suwannee Springs, where they bound Willie by the hands and feet, and forced the youth to choose between getting shot and jumping into the Suwannee River. After his father said he could do nothing to save him, Willie jumped into the river and drowned. Goff, McCullers, and Scott signed an affidavit which stated that they had only wanted James Howard to whip his son and, rather than be whipped by his father, Willie had committed suicide by jumping into the river. James Howard also signed the affidavit, but after selling his home and moving to Orlando, he recanted. Harry T. Moore, of the NAACP, interviewed the parents. After a county grand jury failed to indict, Moore was able to get a federal investigation started, but no convictions followed. Goff, McCullers, and Scott died without having to face murder charges.

Aftermath
A documentary film on the murder, Murder on the Suwannee River, was produced in 2006 by Marvin Dunn, a historian, who tried to get Charlie Crist, then attorney general and later governor of Florida, to reopen the case, but to no avail; neither was his case investigated under the Emmett Till Unsolved Civil Rights Crime Act. It is frequently cited as comparable to the case of Emmett Till, who was also lynched (at age 14) for allegedly making advances at a white woman at a grocery store.

Tameka Hobbs wrote about the lynching and three other lynchings in her 2015 book Democracy Abroad, Lynching at Home: Racial Violence in Florida.

See also
List of unsolved murders

References

External links
"Willie James Howard"
"Willie James Howard Lynching"

1944 deaths
1944 in Florida
1944 murders in the United States
African-American history between emancipation and the civil rights movement
African-American history of Florida
Anti-black racism in the United States
Crimes in Florida
Deaths by person in Florida
History of racism in Florida
History of Suwannee County, Florida
January 1944 events
Lynching deaths in Florida
Lynching victims in the United States
Male murder victims
Murdered African-American people
People from Live Oak, Florida
People murdered in Florida
Racially motivated violence against African Americans
Race-related controversies in the United States
Suwannee County, Florida
Unsolved murders in the United States